The Ronna and Eric Hoffman Gallery of Contemporary Art, or simply Hoffman Art Gallery, is an art gallery and building on the Lewis & Clark College campus, in Portland, Oregon. The gallery opened in 1997.

References

External links
 

1997 establishments in Oregon
Art galleries established in 1997
Art museums and galleries in Oregon
Buildings and structures completed in 1997
Contemporary art galleries in the United States
Lewis & Clark College buildings